Paul Capdeville was the defending champion but decided not to participate.
Michael Yani won the final 6–4, 7–6(13–11) against Fritz Wolmarans.

Seeds

Draw

Finals

Top half

Bottom half

References
 Main draw
 Qualifying draw

Singles